Sir Frederick Charles Chaney  (20 October 1914 – 17 December 2001) was an Australian politician. He served as a member of the House of Representatives from 1955 to 1969, as federal Minister for the Navy from 1964 to 1966, as Administrator of the Northern Territory from 1970 to 1973, and finally as Lord Mayor of Perth from 1978 to 1982.

Early life
Chaney was born in Fremantle, Western Australia and educated in state and Catholic schools. As a result of his sporting ability he won a scholarship to attend Christian Brothers' College, Perth. He taught in state schools from 1932 and married Mavis, a fellow teacher, in 1938. In 1941, he enlisted in the Royal Australian Air Force as a pilot and flying instructor and served in Australia, New Guinea and Borneo and was awarded the Air Force Cross. Chaney and his wife had four sons (including Fred, a deputy leader of the Liberal Party; Michael, a businessman; and John, a judge) and three daughters.

Politics
Chaney was elected at the 1955 election as the Liberal member for the Australian House of Representatives seat of Perth. He was appointed Minister for the Navy in Robert Menzies' December 1963 ministry, but not sworn in until 4 March 1964, due to the need to pass legislation to enlarge the ministry.  In the interim, on 10 February 1964 the Melbourne–Voyager collision took place, and Chaney was responsible for dealing with its repercussions.  He was not reappointed to Harold Holt's second ministry in December 1966 and he was defeated at the 1969 election by Labor candidate, Joe Berinson.

Chaney was the Administrator of the Northern Territory from 1970 to 1973 and was a strong advocate for Aboriginal land rights.  He was Lord Mayor of Perth from 1978 to 1982. He was made a Commander of the Order of the British Empire (CBE) in 1970 and Knight Commander of the Order (KBE) in 1981.

Notes

External links

1914 births
2001 deaths
Royal Australian Air Force personnel of World War II
Australian Knights Commander of the Order of the British Empire
Australian politicians awarded knighthoods
Liberal Party of Australia members of the Parliament of Australia
Members of the Australian House of Representatives for Perth
Members of the Australian House of Representatives
Mayors and Lord Mayors of Perth, Western Australia
Australian recipients of the Air Force Cross (United Kingdom)
Administrators of the Northern Territory
People educated at Christian Brothers' College, Perth
Australian schoolteachers
20th-century Australian politicians